The Czech Republic men's national ice hockey team is the national ice hockey team of the Czech Republic. It is one of the most successful national ice hockey teams in the world and a member of the so-called "Big Six", the unofficial group of the six strongest men's ice hockey nations, along with Canada, Finland, Russia, Sweden and the United States. It is governed by the Czech Ice Hockey Association. The Czech Republic has 85,000 men players officially enrolled in organized hockey (0.8% of its population).

The Czechs won the gold medal at the 1998 Winter Olympics and won three straight gold medals at the world championships from 1999 to 2001. In the next three years, the team did not get a medal at the world championships—not even home at the 2004 Men's World Ice Hockey Championships held in Prague and Ostrava, thus keeping the "world championship home ice curse" alive. The following year, however, the Czechs won gold at the 2005 tournament, the only world championship where, due to the 2004–05 NHL lockout, all NHL players were available to participate.

At the 2006 Winter Olympics, the Czechs won a bronze medal, defeating Russia 3–0 (roster) in the bronze medal game. At the 2006 Men's World Ice Hockey Championships, the Czechs earned silver, falling to Sweden in the final, the only time the Czechs have lost the final game of the tournament. The Czech Republic won the 2010 World Championships in Germany. For the first time in history, the Czech Republic did not qualify for the quarterfinals at the 2022 Winter Olympics and finished in ninth place, their lowest placement in history, but won a bronze medal at the 2022 IIHF World Championship later the same year, ending its longest medal drought in IIHF tournaments in history, which had lasted since 2012.

Tournament record

Olympic Games

World Championship

World Cup of Hockey

Euro Hockey Tour

Team

Current roster
Roster for the 2022 IIHF World Championship.

Head coach: Kari Jalonen

Retired numbers
 4 – Karel Rachůnek
 15 – Jan Marek
 63 – Josef Vašíček

Coaching history
Olympics
1994 – Ivan Hlinka
1998 – Ivan Hlinka
2002 – Josef Augusta
2006 – Alois Hadamczik
2010 – Vladimír Růžička
2014 – Alois Hadamczik
2018 – Josef Jandač
2022 – Filip Pešán
World Championships
1993–1994 – Ivan Hlinka
1995–1996 – Luděk Bukač
1997–1999 – Ivan Hlinka
2000–2002 – Josef Augusta
2003–2004 – Slavomír Lener
2005 – Vladimír Růžička
2006–2008 – Alois Hadamczik
2009–2010 – Vladimír Růžička
2011–2013 – Alois Hadamczik
2014–2015 – Vladimír Růžička
2016 – Vladimír Vůjtek
2017–2018 – Josef Jandač
2019 – Miloš Říha
2021 – Filip Pešán
2022 – Kari Jalonen

Uniform evolution

See also
Bohemia national ice hockey team
Czechoslovak national ice hockey team
Protectorate of Bohemia and Moravia men's national ice hockey team

References

External links

IIHF profile
National Teams of Ice Hockey

 
National ice hockey teams in Europe
Ice hockey in the Czech Republic